Tinc or TINC may refer to:

 Tinc (band) from Japan
 Tinc (protocol) in computing
 Tinc (retail), UK store chain
 The (International) Noise Conspiracy, a Swedish rock band
 There Is No Cabal, a Usenet catchphrase
 TiNC, a coating material made by Micromy